Total Rational! is a Rational Youth compilation album, released (without authorisation from the band) by the Dutch label Rams Horn, who had previously released the Cold War Night Life album and some singles on license from YUL records.

Total Rational! contains the entire Cold War Night Life album, single tracks and extended mixes, including the unauthorised extended remix of "Dancing On The Berlin Wall". Unfortunately, the running order is much altered from the original album; also, it appears to have been mastered from vinyl copies.

Track listing
"Mondays in Moravia" – 4:03 
"Far from the City" – 4:35
"Sound the Glockenspiel" – 5:10
"Strength Area" – 3:36
"Waltzing on Tammany Hall" – 4:33
"Watch out for the Insect" – 4:03
"Village of Dusk" – 3:48
"Just a Murmur in the Evening" – 4:49
"Pile ou ?" – 5:37
"The Shining of the Moon" – 2:54
"Baby got Back" – 4:00

Personnel
 Tracy Howe - vocals, synthesizers
 Bill Vorn - synthesizers, programming, vocoder
 Kevin Komoda - synthesizers

1994 compilation albums